David Johnny Oduya  (born 1 October 1981) is a Swedish former professional ice hockey defenceman who played in the National Hockey League (NHL). He is of Kenyan Luo descent on his father's side. Oduya is a two-time Stanley Cup champion with the Chicago Blackhawks in 2013 and 2015.

Playing career

Early career
Oduya's first club was Hammarby IF, where he played as a junior. In 2000, at the age of 19, he moved to North America to play in the Quebec Major Junior Hockey League (QMJHL). He spent one season in North America, splitting time between the Victoriaville Tigres and Moncton Wildcats. After moving back to Sweden, he played two seasons with Hammarby in HockeyAllsvenskan before signing a contract with Djurgårdens IF in the Swedish Elitserien. During the two seasons he spent with the team, he was known as an aggressive defenceman and an enforcer. At times, he fought with opposition players and registered high penalties in minutes numbers. Despite this, he was also a dependable player and played regularly in the Swedish national team during the Euro Hockey Tour. In the 2005–06 season, after he had been dismissed by the Washington Capitals, the NHL organization that drafted him 221st overall in 2001, he moved to another Swedish team, Frölunda HC. With Frölunda, he played as a more offensive defenceman, scoring eight goals and 11 assists.

New Jersey Devils
The following season, 2006–07, Oduya signed with the New Jersey Devils in the NHL. Although expected by many to be a depth player with the Devils, when several of the team's defenders were injured, Oduya earned a spot in the lineup. He played surprisingly well in the NHL, periodically registering nearly 20 minutes of ice time per game. He played in 76 Devils games that season, only missing eight due to a mid-season injury. However, in the 2007 Stanley Cup playoffs, he was not dressed for New Jersey when the Devils were defeated in the second round, largely due to the impressive play of rookie defenceman Andy Greene. After several successful NHL seasons, Oduya was named to the Swedish roster for the 2010 Winter Olympics in Vancouver, British Columbia, Canada.

Atlanta Thrashers/Winnipeg Jets
On 4 February 2010, he was traded to the Atlanta Thrashers, along with Niclas Bergfors, Patrice Cormier and a first-round draft pick in 2010, in exchange for Ilya Kovalchuk and Anssi Salmela. Oduya skated for the team during its inaugural season after moving to Winnipeg, Manitoba to become the Winnipeg Jets.

Chicago Blackhawks
On 27 February 2012, Oduya was traded to the Chicago Blackhawks for a second- and third-round pick in 2013.

In October 2012, during the 2012–13 NHL lockout, Oduya traveled to Bangkok, Thailand, to play for the local Flying Farangs team in the 18th Annual "Land of Smiles" Hockey tournament. He carried his team to the championship against Abu-Dhabi, and helped bring home Bangkok's first title in tournament history.

In June 2013, Oduya won his first Stanley Cup with the Chicago Blackhawks, who defeated the Boston Bruins in six games in the Finals. In Game 6 of the Stanley Cup Finals, Oduya assisted on the Cup winning goal scored by Dave Bolland. Oduya's shot came from the left point and deflected off the stick of Michael Frolík. Bolland, in position in front of the Boston goal, pushed the deflected shot past Bruins goaltender Tuukka Rask to give the Blackhawks their second Stanley Cup in four years.

On 15 June 2015, at the United Center in Chicago, Oduya won his second Stanley Cup with the Chicago Blackhawks over the Tampa Bay Lightning in six games. It was the Blackhawks' third Stanley Cup in six years.

Dallas Stars
After four seasons with the Blackhawks, Oduya left as a free agent and signed a two-year contract with the Dallas Stars on 15 July 2015. Blackhawks teammate Patrick Sharp also joined the Stars a few weeks earlier via trade.

Later years: Second stint in Chicago, Ottawa and Philadelphia
In the final year of his contract with the Stars in the 2016–17 season, Oduya was traded back to Chicago in exchange for Mark McNeill and a conditional fourth-round draft pick on 28 February 2017. He played out the season with the Blackhawks appearing in 15 regular season games for 1 goal and 1 assist.

As a free agent, having left the Blackhawks for a second time, Oduya agreed to a one-year bonus-ladened contract with the Ottawa Senators on 24 July 2017. After being placed on waivers by the Senators, Oduya was claimed by the Philadelphia Flyers on 26 February 2018. After playing in only one game as a Flyer on 4 March, he was pulled out of the lineup with a lower body injury on 10 March. He did not play another game with the Flyers before his contract expired.

Personal life
Oduya is the son of a Kenyan father and a Swedish mother. He is the younger brother of the late Fredrik Oduya, a former NHL draftee who was an enforcer in the minor leagues.

Career statistics

Regular season and playoffs

International

Awards and honors

See also
 List of ice hockey players of black African descent

References

External links

 

1981 births
Living people
Atlanta Thrashers players
Chicago Blackhawks players
Dallas Stars players
Djurgårdens IF Hockey players
Frölunda HC players
Hammarby Hockey (1921–2008) players
Ice hockey players at the 2010 Winter Olympics
Ice hockey players at the 2014 Winter Olympics
Black ice hockey players
Medalists at the 2014 Winter Olympics
Moncton Wildcats players
New Jersey Devils players
Olympic ice hockey players of Sweden
Olympic medalists in ice hockey
Olympic silver medalists for Sweden
Ottawa Senators players
Philadelphia Flyers players
Ice hockey people from Stockholm
Stanley Cup champions
Swedish expatriate ice hockey players in the United States
Swedish ice hockey defencemen
Swedish people of Kenyan descent
Swedish sportspeople of African descent
Swedish people of Luo descent
Victoriaville Tigres players
Washington Capitals draft picks
Winnipeg Jets players